The Brinkman number (Br) is a dimensionless number related to heat conduction from a wall to a flowing viscous fluid, commonly used in polymer processing.  It is named after the Dutch mathematician and physicist Henri Brinkman. There are several definitions; one is

where
 μ is the dynamic viscosity;
 u is the flow velocity;
 κ is the thermal conductivity;
 T0 is the bulk fluid temperature;
 Tw is the wall temperature;
 Pr is the Prandtl number
 Ec is the  Eckert number

It is the ratio between heat produced by viscous dissipation and heat transported by molecular conduction. i.e., the ratio of viscous heat generation to external heating. The higher its value, the slower the conduction of heat produced by viscous dissipation and hence the larger the temperature rise.

In, for example, a screw extruder, the energy supplied to the polymer melt comes primarily from two sources:
 viscous heat generated by shear between elements of the flowing liquid moving at different velocities;
 direct heat conduction from the wall of the extruder.

The former is supplied by the motor turning the screw, the latter by heaters. The Brinkman number is a measure of the ratio of the two.

References

 
 
 
 

Continuum mechanics
Dimensionless numbers of fluid mechanics
Dimensionless numbers of thermodynamics
Polymer chemistry